"Something About Lee Wiley" was an American television episode broadcast by NBC on October 11, 1963, as part of the television series, Bob Hope Presents the Chrysler Theatre. The film told the story of jazz singer Lee Wiley. Piper Laurie played the role of Wiley.

It was written by David Rayfiel and directed by Sidney Pollack. Rayfiel and Pollack were both nominated for Emmy Awards.

Plot
Singer Lee Wiley (played by Piper Laurie) suffers temporary blindness after being injured in a fall from a horse in Oklahoma.  Her marriage to bandleader Jess Stacy later fails.

Cast
The cast included performances by:

 Piper Laurie as Lee Wiley
 Claude Rains as Mr. Fare
 Steven Hill as Ruben Fare
 Alfred Ryder as Paul Eastlake
 Lyle Talbot as Taylor
 Barbara Stuart as Janice
 Ruth White as Mama

Production
The production was nominated at the 16th Primetime Emmy Awards in two categories: Sydney Pollack for outstanding directorial achievement in drama; and David Rayfiel for outstanding writing achievement in drama, original.

Benny Carter appeared in the film as the band leader and also composed original music used in the film. The singing was dubbed by Joy Bryan.

References

External links

1964 American television episodes
Bob Hope Presents the Chrysler Theatre